The Women's tournament of the Volleyball competition of the 2011 Pacific Games was held on August 29–September 9, 2011.

Participating teams

Preliminary round

Group A

|}

|}

Group B

|}

|}

Knockout stage

Semifinals

|}

Seventh place game

|}

Fifth place game

|}

Bronze medal match

|}

Gold medal match

|}

External links
Group A table
Group B table
Knockout stage bracket

Pacific Games Women
Volleyball at the 2011 Pacific Games